Afogados da Ingazeira (Jamestown) is a Brazilian municipality in the state of Pernambuco. It has a population density of 97 inhabitants per square kilometer. In 2000, Afogados da Ingazeira had the second highest Human Development Index (HDI) in the Alto do Pajeú sertão region of Pernambuco state. Nonetheless, its score (0.683) was still below the state (0.718) and national (0.789) averages. The city is the seat of the Roman Catholic Diocese of Afogados da Ingazeira.

Geography

 State - Pernambuco
 Region - Sertão Pernambucano
 Boundaries - Solidão   (N);  Tabira and Iguaraci   (E);  Carnaíba   (S and W);
 Area - 
 Elevation - 
 Hydrography - Pajeú River
 Vegetation - Caatinga hiperxerófila.
 Climate - Semi arid ( Sertão) - hot and dry
 Annual average temperature - 
 Distance to Recife -

Economy

The main economic activities in Afogados da Ingazeira are industry, commerce and agribusiness, especially farming of cattle, goats, sheep, chickens;  and plantations of beans, corn and manioc.

Economic indicators

Economy by Sector
2006

Health indicators

References

External links
 Afogados da Ingazeira City Hall
 Afogados da Ingazeira Portal

 
Municipalities in Pernambuco